100 Winners was a live interactive game show on GSN, officially hosted by Jessica York. Jeff Thisted and Shandi Finnessey served as substitute hosts. Featured during the two-hour program were short interactive games from which the viewers could win prizes. The show generally aired from 12:00 midnight – 2:00 a.m. every Tuesday, Wednesday, and Sunday night (technically early Wednesday, Thursday, and Monday morning in the Eastern Time Zone). All scheduled airings of 100 Winners were replaced with episodes of quiznation.

Format
100 Winners was a game show where home viewers are the contestants.  American residents 18 or older were eligible to enter the contest by text messaging a request or using the network's website. Potential contestants could enter up to ten times per phone number per method on each show. However someone can only be brought through to answer a question once a night.

Within a few moments, a contestant was notified whether or not their entry is chosen (at random) to proceed to another random selection process. If an entry were selected in the second phase, the contestant will be called on his or her home or mobile phone, depending on the method of entry. The contestant will then come on-air and be held in the queue for up to three games. If a contestant was selected to participate in a break game, an operator will take their answer and assign them a prize value. GSN charges a $.99 fee for each text message entry, in addition to standard text messaging rates charged by the wireless provider. Entries on the website are free. Regardless of the method of entry, each entry had an equal chance of being selected. An entry did not necessarily guarantee an opportunity to appear on the show. Residents of certain states may be ineligible to play various entry methods.

The format was based on The Cash Vault, a game show that aired on the British Quiznation.

Programming history
On February 20, 2007, PlayMania, the original GSN interactive game show, broke off into two separate programs, quiznation and 100 Winners. Collectively, the programs are known as the PlayMania Block.

All episodes of 100 Winners were hosted by Mel Peachey until the second hour on March 21, 2007, when Jessica York replaced her. It was presumed that York would continue to host this program, and Peachey would host quiznation until Shandi Finnessey, the official quiznation host, was finished with Dancing with the Stars.  Finnessey's tenure with Stars ended on April 3 when she was eliminated.

On the March 31 episode of quiznation, Peachey announced she was leaving the PlayMania Block to return home to England. The April 7 quiznation was her "goodbye show" and her last night as host.  Peachey hosted her last 100 Winners on April 4.  York has hosted ever since, although Finnessey substituted for her during the week of May 1.

A schedule change began May 6. A Sunday edition of 100 Winners airs in place of the previously scheduled quiznation. In its place, the Thursday slot featured an episode of quiznation. Jeff Thisted, a contestant coordinator on The Price is Right, hosted his first full show on the May 20 100 Winners.

All airings of 100 Winners were replaced by airings of quiznation.  The show has been indefinitely canceled from the programming schedule, as it ceased to be referenced in the official rules of the PlayMania Block. The final show, hosted by Thisted, aired June 13, 2007.

Games
100 Winners featured quick, simple mini-games that were played throughout the program.  If a contestant answers a question correctly, he/she chooses one of the one hundred safe deposit boxes on the set, each of which contains a prize of either cash or GSN merchandise.

To make winners more quickly, the host offered:
 Multiple choices of doors (including "friends and family" questions allowing four doors to be opened)
 Break Game: A question answered off-screen during a commercial break to make more winners.
 Sizzling Hot Questions: An extra choice of door if the contestant receives a prize of a designated value.
 Sponsor bonuses: An extra choice of door if the contestant's original box contains the mascot of that episode's corporate sponsor, if any.

The games listed were played in rotation on the program.

The vault
The 100 safes are divided among four panels each with twenty-five safes, featuring cash prizes. When the show began, clues were often shown giving hints to where the larger prizes are located.  However, since mid-April, clues were rarely given, undoubtedly to heighten the suspense of the television presentation.

Vault prize distribution

Layout of The Vault
This was the layout used on the final broadcasts of 100 Winners.

The total amount in this vault layout is $4,983.90 in cash and prizes.
1The package includes a GSN mug (ARV $3.75), hat (ARV $7.95) and PlayMania T-shirt. (ARV $7.75), totaling an ARV of $19.45.

General layout
This layout was used on the premiere, but was skipped on various weeks in favor of the all-cash vault. The first episode also had a door containing $.99, instead of a $10 prize.

This vault layout contains an average value of $5,042.80 in cash and prizes.
²Each door has a various piece of merchandise including GSN mugs (ARV $3.75), hats (ARV $7.95), beanie caps (ARV $10.50), playing cards (ARV $7.00) and PlayMania T-shirts. (ARV $7.75)

All-cash layout
This layout was first used on March 27, 2007. The GSN merchandise had been removed. The $1,000 top was split into two $500 top prizes for two episodes, but the March 29 episode returned to the original top prize.

This vault layout contains a total of $5,200 in cash.

See also
 Quiz channel
 PlayMania
 quiznation

Notes and references

External links
 PlayMania Block Official Site 
 

Phone-in quiz shows
Game Show Network original programming
2000s American game shows
2007 American television series debuts
2007 American television series endings
English-language television shows